Karenia is a genus of cicadas in the family Cicadidae, found in Asia and Indomalaya. There are about six described species in Karenia.

Species
These six species belong to the genus Karenia:
 Karenia caelatata Distant, 1890
 Karenia chama Wei & Zhang, 2009
 Karenia hoanglienensis Pham & Yang, 2012
 Karenia ravida Distant, 1888
 Karenia sulcata Lei & Chou, 1997
 Karenia tibetensis Pham & Constant, 2014

References

Further reading

 
 
 
 
 
 
 
 
 

Cicadidae genera